Grelier is a French surname. Notable people with the surname include:

 Estelle Grelier (born 1973), French politician
 Jean-Carles Grelier (born 1966), French politician

See also
 Gaulier (disambiguation)
 Grolier (disambiguation)

French-language surnames